Rajendra is popular Hindu given name. It is derived from the Sanskrit  'lord of kings', 'supreme sovereign', which is a compound of the words  'king' and  'supreme'.

Notable people with the name include:
 Rajendra Chola I, Rajendra Chola II and Rajendra Chola III, Chola emperors in the 11th and 13th centuries
 Rajendra Kharel (active from 1999), Nepalese politician
 Rajendra Krishan, Bollywood lyricist and writer
 Rajendra Kumar (1927–1999), Bollywood actor
 Rajendra Kumar KC (active from 2013), Nepalese politician
 Rajendra Mahato (born 1958), Nepali politician
 Rajendra Patel, Gujarati language poet, short story writer and critic
 Rajendra Prasad, the first President of India
 Rajendra Prasad (actor), Telugu language actor
 Rajendra Rajya Lakshmi Devi, wife of King Pratap Singh Shah
 Rajendra Bikram Shah, king of Nepal

See also
King of Kings

Notes and references

Indian masculine given names
Hindu given names